

The 2010 Sunderland Council election took place on 6 May 2010 to elect members of Sunderland Metropolitan Borough Council in Tyne and Wear, England. One third of the council was up for election and the Labour Party stayed in overall control of the council. The election took place on the same day as the 2010 General Election.

Campaign
Before the election Sunderland council had 48 Labour, 21 Conservative, 1 Liberal Democrat and 5 Independent councillors. The Independents were made up of 4 in an alliance and 1, Eddie Wake, described as an "Independent Conservative" having been suspended from the Conservative Party in the period since the last local elections in May 2008.

In total 89 candidates stood for the 25 seats being contested, with a full 25 from the Labour Party, 23 Conservatives, 23 Liberal Democrats, 12 British National Party, 2 Green Party and 4 Independents. This was a substantial decline in candidates for the British National Party, which in previous years had contested every ward. The 2 seats not contested by the Conservative party in Copt Hill and Houghton were where Independent candidates had been successful in previous years, with the Conservative party leader on the council Lee Martin saying the party would not have been able to win the seats. The seats were again contested by Independents campaigning against the Houghton Quarry landfill site.

Labour were confident of making gains, pointing to the lowest council tax in the North East and efforts to improve schools and address unemployment. However the Conservatives were also looking to make gains and particularly targeted seats they had previously won in Doxford, Ryhope and Washington South.

Election results
The results saw the Labour party increase their majority on the council after gaining 4 seats to hold 52 of the 75 seats. Labour held every seat they had been defending, while gaining seats from the Conservatives in Barnes, St Peter's and Washington East, and taking Millfield from an Independent, Peter Maddison. Peter Maddison, who was deputy leader of the Independent group, came last in Millfield with 133 votes and independents also failed to take Copt Hill and Houghton. Meanwhile, the Liberal Democrats failed to win any seats, but did see an increase in votes for the party. Overall turnout was 55.02%, compared to 34.9% at the 2008 election, with the highest turnout in Fulwell at 68%.

The Conservative leader on the council Lee Martin put his parties failure down to a higher turnout due to the election taking place at the same time as the general election and a higher than usual vote share for the Liberal Democrats. Following the election Lee Martin resigned as leader of the Conservative group and was succeeded by Tony Morrissey.

This resulted in the following composition of the Council:

Ward by ward results

Barnes ward

Castle ward

Copt Hill ward

Doxford ward

Fulwell ward

Hendon ward

Hetton ward

Houghton ward

Millfield ward 

†Peter Maddison had been elected in 2006 as a Liberal Democrat candidate, but subsequently left the party to sit as an Independent councillor. As such, this win for Labour was technically a gain from the Liberal Democrats.

Pallion ward

Redhill ward

Ryhope ward

Sandhill ward

Shiney Row ward

Silksworth ward

Southwick ward

St Anne's ward

St Chad's ward

St Michael's ward

St Peter's ward

Washington Central ward

Washington East ward

Washington North ward

Washington South ward

Washington West ward

References

2010 English local elections
May 2010 events in the United Kingdom
2010
21st century in Tyne and Wear